Igor Alekseyev (born January 10, 1960) as of 2011 held the position of the People's Deputy of Ukraine. Alekseyev was born in the eastern Ukraine city of Donetsk.

Biography

Education
Alekseyev attended the Donetsk higher military-political school for engineer troops and signal corps. In 1991 he attended the Lenin Military-Political Academy. In 1998 he completed a Master's degree in Foreign Policy at the Diplomatic Academy affiliated with Ministry of Internal Affairs of Ukraine.

Career
Alekseyev served in the Soviet and Ukrainian military from 1981-1996. From 1981-1983 he was a Signal company executive officer in Kiev. From 1983-1985 he was  Secretary of the Komsomol committee, agitator of political section at the Kiev Higher Military-Engineering School. From 1985-1988 he was the agitator of a military unit in Magadan. From 1988-1991 he was a student at the Lenin Military-Political Academy in Moscow. 
From 1991-1994 he taught at the Kyiv Army Institute. From 1994-1996 he served as 1st Secretary of the Munitions and Disarmament Control Office, Ministry of Foreign Affairs of Ukraine. From 1996-1998 he studied at the Diplomatic Academy, Ukraine. From 1998-2002 he was Consul of Diplomatic Mission of Ukraine to the Kingdom of Denmark

Igor Alekseyev joined the Communist Party of Ukraine in 1987.

Plenary
In 2002 Alekseyev began serving as an elected People's Deputy. He was in the 4th, 5th and 6th Verkhovna Rada (2002 - 2006]), as No. 50 in the party list. He was a member of the Communist Party fraction (May 2002). He was a member of the Committee on Foreign Affairs (June 2002) and chairman of the subcommittee on International Treaties.  In the 5th Verkhovna Rada he was 14 in the party list, serving as Chairman of the Subcommittee of International and Legal Affairs of the Committee on Foreign Affairs (July 2006).

See also 
 List of Ukrainian Parliament Members 2007
 Verkhovna Rada

References

External links 
  Igor Alekseyev at Verkhovna Rada of Ukraine official web-site

1960 births
Living people
Politicians from Donetsk
Fourth convocation members of the Verkhovna Rada
Fifth convocation members of the Verkhovna Rada
Sixth convocation members of the Verkhovna Rada
Seventh convocation members of the Verkhovna Rada
Communist Party of Ukraine politicians
Ukrainian diplomats
Lenin Military Political Academy alumni